Berthold von Schenk (1895–1974) was a pastor of Lutheran Church–Missouri Synod and pioneer of Lutheran liturgical renewal.

Rev. von Schenk was trained for ordained ministry at Concordia Seminary, St. Louis, and served first as pastor of a mission congregation in St. Louis, Bethesda Lutheran Church. Notably he served as an inner-city pastor of Our Saviour Lutheran Church and School in The Bronx, New York. He was an internationally renowned author and scholar. He participated in the first of ecumenical Protestant-Roman Catholic consultations prior to Second Vatican Council.

Son of Walter von Schenk (1852-1921) who came from Germany to the United States and was a member of the Schenck zu Schweinsberg family. He and his descendants dropped the long version of the family name. He was a cousin of Claus Schenk Graf von Stauffenberg, who tried to assassinate Adolf Hitler.

Works
The Presence: An Approach to the Holy Communion. Published by E. Kaufmann, inc, 1945, 189 pages
The Presence: An approach to the Holy Communion. Edited by Paul Robert Sauer. Published by The American Lutheran Publicity Bureau, 2010, 174 pages.

Literature
Berthold Von Schenk (1895-1974): Pioneer of Lutheran Liturgical Renewal By C. George Fry, Joel R. Kurz. Published by E. Mellen Press, 2004 
Lively Stone: The Autobiography of Berthold Von Schenk By B Von Schenk, C George Fry, Joel R Kurz. Published by American Lutheran Publicity Bureau, 2006 
 Sauer, Paul Robert. "Berthold von Schenk: Out of Step or Before His Times?." [Lutheran Church–Missouri Synod pastor and a leader in the Lutheran liturgical renewal movement] Concordia Theological Quarterly 74 (2010) No. 1: 39–56. http://www.ctsfw.net/media/pdfs/SauerBertholdVonSchenk74-1,2.pdf.

References

1895 births
1974 deaths
Officers Crosses of the Order of Merit of the Federal Republic of Germany
20th-century American Lutheran clergy
Lutheran Church–Missouri Synod people
Concordia Seminary alumni